Bareface Bluff is a large, sheer snow-free bluff,  high, rising above Skelton Glacier, between Ant Hill Glacier and Mason Glacier in Antarctica. It was surveyed and given this descriptive name in 1957 by the New Zealand party of the Commonwealth Trans-Antarctic Expedition, 1956–58.

References

 

Cliffs of the Ross Dependency
Hillary Coast